Kawo Koysha is one of the woredas in the Southern Nations, Nationalities, and Peoples' Region of Ethiopia part of the Wolayita Zone. Kawo Koysha is bordered on the south by Offa woreda, on the west by the Kindo Didaye, on the north by the Kindo Koysha, on the east by Sodo Zurya. Kawo Koysha woreda was established in 2019 from the surrounding woredas. The administrative center of this woreda is Lasho Town.

Notes 

Wolayita
Districts of the Southern Nations, Nationalities, and Peoples' Region